Terrence Leonard Tisdell (born 16 March 1998) is a Liberian professional footballer who plays as a winger or striker for Sumgayit and the Liberia national team.

Club career

FC Fassell
In mid-2015, Terrence joined  FC Fassell, making 41 appearances and scoring 13 goals in the Liberian Premier League.

LISCR FC
During the 2017 season, he joined fellow Liberian side LISCR on a three-year deal.

Costa do Sol
He departed Liberia for Mozambique in 2018, joining Costa do Sol on a season-long loan deal.

Sanjoanense
Later that year, Tisdell moved to Portugal where he joined Campeonato de Portugal side Sanjoanense.

Baroka
He returned to Africa on 3 July 2019, signing with South Africa South African Premiership side Baroka.

Hapoel Petah Tikva
On 27 August 2020, he signed for Israeli side Hapoel Petah Tikva.

Kocaelispor
In July 2021 he moved to Turkish First Division club Kocaelispor on a two-year deal.

Botoșani
In January 2022 he signed for Romanian club Botoșani.

Sumgayit
On 23 December 2022, Sumgayit announced the signing of Tisdell until the end of the season.

International career
Tisdell has represented Liberia at the under-20 and senior levels, serving as a mainstay for the latter since his debut in 2016.

International stats

International goals
Scores and results list Liberia's goal tally first.

Honors
 Costa do Sol
Taça de Moçambique: 2018 
Supertaça Moçambique : 2018 

Individual Honors
LFA Super Cup Most Valuable Player Award: 2018

References

External links

1998 births
Living people
Sportspeople from Monrovia
Liberian footballers
Liberia international footballers
FC Fassell players
LISCR FC players
CD Costa do Sol players
A.D. Sanjoanense players
Baroka F.C. players
Hapoel Petah Tikva F.C. players
Kocaelispor footballers
FC Botoșani players
Sumgayit FK players
Campeonato de Portugal (league) players
Liga Leumit players
Liga I players
Azerbaijan Premier League players
Liberian expatriate footballers
Expatriate footballers in Mozambique
Expatriate footballers in Portugal
Expatriate soccer players in South Africa
Expatriate footballers in Israel
Expatriate footballers in Turkey
Expatriate footballers in Romania
Expatriate footballers in Azerbaijan
Liberian expatriate sportspeople in Mozambique
Liberian expatriate sportspeople in Portugal
Liberian expatriate sportspeople in South Africa
Liberian expatriate sportspeople in Israel
Liberian expatriate sportspeople in Turkey
Liberian expatriate sportspeople in Romania
Liberian expatriate sportspeople in Azerbaijan
Liberia under-20 international footballers
Association football wingers